This article shows the rosters of all participating teams at the 2016 Asian Women's Club Volleyball Championship in Biñan, Philippines.

Pool A

Foton Pilipinas
The following is the roster of the Filipino club Foton Pilipinas in the 2016 Asian Women's Club Volleyball Championship.

Head coach:  Fabio Menta

Liên Việt Post Bank
The following is the roster of the Vietnamese club Liên Việt Post Bank in the 2016 Asian Women's Club Volleyball Championship.

Head coach:  Phạm Văn Long

Kwai Tsing
The following is the roster of the Hong Kong club Kwai Tsing in the 2016 Asian Women's Club Volleyball Championship.

Head coach:  Lam Chun Kwok

Pool B

Bangkok Glass
The following is the roster of the Thai club Bangkok Glass in the 2016 Asian Women's Club Volleyball Championship.

Head coach:  Kittipong Pornchartyingcheep

April 25
The following is the roster of the North Korean club April 25 in the 2016 Asian Women's Club Volleyball Championship.

Head coach:  Moro Branislav

Sarmayeh Bank Tehran
The following is the roster of the Iranian club Sarmayeh Bank Tehran in the 2016 Asian Women's Club Volleyball Championship.

Head coach:  Majda Cicic

Pool C

NEC Red Rockets
The following is the roster of the Japanese club NEC Red Rockets in the 2016 Asian Women's Club Volleyball Championship.

Head coach:  Akinori Yamada

Altay
The following is the roster of the Kazakhstani club Altay in the 2016 Asian Women's Club Volleyball Championship.

Head coach:  Burhan Şaik Canbolat

Jakarta Electric PLN
The following is the roster of the Indonesian club Jakarta Electric PLN in the 2016 Asian Women's Club Volleyball Championship.

Head coach:  Tian Mei

Pool D

Ba'yi Shenzhen
The following is the roster of the Chinese club Ba'yi Shenzhen in the 2016 Asian Women's Club Volleyball Championship.

Head coach:  Yu Juemin

T. Grand
The following is the roster of the Taiwanese club T. Grand in the 2016 Asian Women's Club Volleyball Championship.

Head coach:  Lo Chung-jen

Malaysia
The following is the roster of the Malaysian national team which will compete as a club in the 2016 Asian Women's Club Volleyball Championship.

Head coach:  Dato' Moh Wung Ming

References

External links
2016 AVC Asian Women’s Club Championship Teams - Philippine SuperLiga

Asian Women's Club Volleyball Championship squads
Voll
2016 in women's volleyball